The Adolf-Reichwein-Gymnasium (short: ARG) is a coeducational gymnasium in Heusenstamm, Germany, established in 1966. It has about 1400 pupils from ages 10 to 19.

History
Adolf-Reichwein-Gymnasium opened on 1 December 1966 at the beginning of a shortened school year, which changed its start date from Easter to the Summer.

In 1970, the school building was completed, so that provisional accommodation was no longer used.

In 1973, the school began student exchanges with the Judd School, and later extended them to Tonbridge Grammar School for Girls, which has since changed its name to Tonbridge Grammar School.

Subjects

Languages 
All in all there are five languages taught at Adolf-Reichwein-Gymnasium in Heusenstamm: German as a native language and English, French, Spanish and Latin as foreign languages.

 German is a core subject and it is taught from year five to year 13. 
 English is taught from year five to year 11, 12 or 13, depending on the student's preference. In year 9, an exchange trip to the partner school in Tonbridge (Kent) is organized. In year 11, pupils are also able to do a one-week internship at a business in Tonbridge.
 At the school, you can choose French either as a first, second or third language. If chosen as first foreign language, English as second foreign language is mandatory. In year 7, it is also possible to do the DELF examination which enables the students to study in France.
 Spanish can be chosen either as a second or third language. In year 11, there is an exchange program with ARG´s partner school I.E.S. Santa Eulalia in Mérida.
 Since the founding of the school, Latin has been an integral part of the foreign language program. Latin can be chosen as a second or third language.

Religious Education 
At the Adolf Reichwein School pupils can choose between catholic or protestant religious education or ethics. Worship takes place at the Maria Himmelskron church after each holiday, where pupils are free to join in.

Music and Art 
There are many music rooms with string, percussion, woodwind and brass instruments, as well as pianos and keyboards. Additionally, pupils have to study music theory. Every student that plays an instrument like the piano, recorder or flute can join the school's "Highschool Band".

The arts department has their own building at school, the K-building. There are many options to display drawings and paintings there.

Before entering Year 11, the students can further choose to learn acting in the following years.

Science 
At the Adolf Reichwein School, there are five computer rooms. Pupils have five math lessons and two chemistry lessons per week. Chemistry starts for all students in year 8. In the C-building, there are many chemistry rooms with fire extinguishers and other safety measures. The subject Physics is picked up in the curriculum in year 7 and students have two lessons per week. Biology starts in year 5 and the biology rooms are also in the C-building. Pupils have two or three lessons per week. The subject Geography is started on entry to the school. Each week Pupils have two lessons of Geography.

Extracurricular activities 
The school offers string classes for years 5 and 6 where the students can learn to play the violin, viola, cello or bass. Starting from year 7, string players can join the school's orchestra. Players of other instruments (e.g. the fiddle) and younger students may join after individually talking to the conductor.
Further, students can one two rock bands. The "Highschool Band" is for older and more advanced players while "The Kid's Rock" consists of younger and mostly beginner players. 
Twice a year, before summer break and christmas, concerts take place where not only the clubs mentioned above but other students, too, may perform. These concerts are usually in the evening, that is why the headmaster usually lets participating students skip the first period on the next day.
Apart from the described clubs, many others are offered, including a choir and a technology club that takes care of the lighting and sound.

Campus 
The ARG-Campus has a gym and four buildings for classrooms named A-, B-, C- and K-buildings.

 The A-Building was built in 1970. It has four floors and 88 rooms. Also the offices and the library are lodged in the A-Building. A computer room is also on the first floor. In the cellar there are additional classrooms. Languages, history, politics, religious education and geography are taught here.
 In the B-building there are eight rooms separated on two floors. The B-building is for upper classes (from 11 to 13).
 In the C-building there are 20 rooms. There are three floors. On the ground floor there are three rooms for music and a cafeteria, too. On the first floor there are eight rooms for physics and computing. On the second floor there are eight rooms for biology and chemistry. It also can be called the Science Building.
 The K-Building has ten rooms and an observatory. The K-Building is for the arts. The ARG has an afternoon club for the observatory. The observatory is also in the school´s emblem. The K-Building has got a ground floor and a first floor. The observatory is on the second floor. In the basement of the A- building there are some art materials. 
 The school has its own gym, built in 2007, with six cabins, showers and toilets. The gym has three sections so three classes can simultaneously use it. A climbing wall is also installed, and there are three equipment rooms, one in each section.

Staff 
The current staff of Adolf-Reichwein-Gymnasium (as of April 2019)

Since September 2009 the Adolf-Reichwein-Gymnasium has a new head teacher, Siegfried Ritter, who had been deputy headmaster of a sixth form before. He teaches Political science, history and French.

Dirk Bittner is the assisting head teacher at the ARG. As an assistant head teacher he has to create the timetables and organize the supply teaching.

There are three school secretaries.

Former staff of Adolf-Reichwein-Gymnasium

Before Bittner was appointed as assisting head teacher Hans Köhring worked from 2000 to 2017 as an assisting head teacher at the ARG. Before Köhring got this job he already had been at this school for 23 years. He was a teacher and a student at that time. He taught history, German, computing and political science. When he was a student he liked to work at the ARG.

Mr. Krech worked at the ARG for more than 20 years. He was responsible for all technical questions.

References

External links
  

Schools in Hesse
Educational institutions established in 1966
Gymnasiums in Germany
1966 establishments in West Germany